Cytochrome P450 26B1 is a protein that in humans is encoded by the CYP26B1 gene.

This gene encodes a member of the cytochrome P450 superfamily of enzymes. The cytochrome P450 proteins are monooxygenases that catalyze many reactions involved in drug metabolism and the synthesis of cholesterol, steroids and other lipids. The enzyme encoded by this gene is involved in the specific inactivation of all-trans-retinoic acid to hydroxylated forms, such as 4-oxo-, 4-OH-, and 18-OH-all-trans-retinoic acid.

In a developing mouse embryo, CYP26B1 is expressed in the distal tip of the forming limb bud with an abundance in the apical ectodermal ridge. In a knockout mouse model, mice manifest with severe limb malformations and die after birth due to respiratory distress. However, if the expression of CYP26B1 is conditionally deleted only prior to E9.5, the limbs are not as severely truncated and more digits are visible. Research suggests that this difference is attributable to the timing of chondroblast differentiation.

CYP26B1 has been shown to be over-expressed in colorectal cancer cells compared to normal colonic epithelium. CYP26B1 expression was also independently prognostic in patients with colorectal cancer and strong expression was associated with a poorer outcome.

In a genome-wide study, CCHCR1, TCN2, TNXB, LTA, FASN, and CYP26B1 were identified as loci associated with a risk for developing esophageal squamous cell carcinoma. Of these loci, CYP26B1 exhibited the highest effect size. Moreover, the CYP26B1 locus was found to have two alleles with differing capacities to catabolize all-trans retinoic acid, a chemotherapeutic agent. When the allele with the higher catabolic capacity, rs138478634-GA, was overexpressed, cell proliferation was significantly enhanced in comparison to the other allele, rs138478634-GG. Additionally, research is suggestive of a lifestyle interaction where individuals with the risk allele who partake in smoking or drinking present with an odd-ratio over 2-fold higher than smokers or drinkers without the variant or individuals who refrain.

See also
 Cytochrome P450 oxidoreductase deficiency

References

External links

Further reading